Ibišević is a Bosnian surname. Notable people with the surname include:

 Elvir Ibišević (born 1998), Bosnian footballer
 Vedad Ibišević (born 1984), Bosnian footballer

Bosnian surnames
Slavic-language surnames
Patronymic surnames